Farhadan (also Romanized as Farhādān and Farhādīān) is a village in Sangar Rural District, in the Central District of Faruj County, North Khorasan Province, Iran. At the 2006 census, its population was 138, in 30 families.

See also
Tali Farhadian, Iranian-born American former federal prosecutor and current candidate for New York County District Attorney

References 

Populated places in Faruj County